Charles Braithwaite (10 September 1845 – 15 April 1946) was an English cricketer. He played four first-class matches between 1881 and 1893, all of them in Philadelphia.

See also
 Lists of oldest cricketers
 List of centenarians (sportspeople)

References

External links
 

1845 births
1946 deaths
English cricketers
English centenarians
Men centenarians